Arafa El-Sayed (born 23 October 1988) is an Egyptian footballer who plays for Wadi Degla as a center forward.

Honors
Zamalek SC:
 Egypt Cup: 2012–13

External links
 

1988 births
Living people
Egyptian footballers
Zamalek SC players
People from Faiyum
Egypt international footballers
Association football forwards
Egyptian Premier League players